The "Jordan River Foundation"  was founded earlier by Queen Nour Al Hussein, the wife of the late king of Jordan Hussein bin Talal, after the death of king Hussein, queen Nour left her position as the Chair person of "Jordan River Foundation" and the new queen Rania took over the position.
The Jordan River Foundation is a Nonprofit organization started back in the early nineties( sometime after 1990) Amman, Jordan to empower society, especially women and children, and in turn, improve the quality of life to secure a better future for all Jordanians. The foundation was founded by and is chaired by queen Nour Al Hussein and then chaired by Queen Rania Al-Abdullah.

Showroom
Located on Jabal Amman, the Jordan River Foundation showroom occupies the house built in the 1936 by Salim al-Odat. Odat rented the house to the British army throughout the 1930s to be used as offices. He sold it in 1939, after which it went through a number of owners in which it was used as a house, a police station, and a school during the 1960s. But in the 1980s, the house was abandoned and fell into disrepair. Then, at the end of the decade, when a potential buyer threatened to tear down the house, architect Zaid al-Qoussous bought it so as to preserve the house. In 1994, the house was bought and renovated by the Jordan River Foundation to be used as their showroom. Several companies and embassies contributed to the renovation:
USAID
Embassy of Japan
Canadian Embassy
Embassy of the Federal Republic of Germany
Australian Embassy
 Othman Mohamed Ali Bdeir
Arab Technical Group
Heating Supplies Company
Technolinks

Bani Hamida Women's Weaving Project

The Bani Hamida Women's Weaving Project is one of the projects hosted by the Jordan River Foundation. It was founded by Rebecca Salti in 1985 who was serving as the Director of Save the Children in Jordan.  The project was heavily supported by Queen Nour Al Hussein .

Based in Mukawir, near Madaba, the project works to promote bedouin handicrafts and to improve economic and social well-being of bedouin women and children. The Bani Hamida handicrafts are displayed in the Jordan River Foundation showroom.

Wadi Al Rayan Project
The Wadi Al Rayan Project is hosted by the Jordan River Foundation showroom. A group of 165 women involved in the project make baskets, mats, and furniture from local banana leaves and cattail reeds.

Management 

Since its inception, Her Majesty Queen Rania Al-Abdullah has been involved in all aspects of JRF's development. As the Chairperson of the Board of Trustees, she chairs Board meetings and provides visionary leadership to ensure the existence of long-term, impact-oriented programs. 
The Foundation's Board of Trustees consists of individuals from the public, private and non-profit sectors who provide valuable leadership and expertise while working in close coordination with the Director General and staff to ensure the strategic development of JRF. The Board oversees and monitors the implementation of all JRF projects, as well as refines administrative and financial systems and procedures. One of the Board's major responsibilities is to ensure that the Foundation operates with fiscally sound and ethically accepted accounting and management practices, thus ensuring the Foundation's transparency and accountability at all times.
JRF's successful management is shaped by an executive team led by the Director General who harnesses the capabilities and expertise of employees to ensure demand-driven implementation and facilitation of its programs and activities.
The Foundation employs 137 experienced staff to manage its programs, centers and services. These qualified individuals participate in continuous training and capacity building activities to enhance their knowledge and skills, creating a dedicated cadre. In addition to the staff, 35 volunteers devote their time and efforts in fundraising activities through annual and ad noc special events. They are also involved in development projects that mobilize community members to address specific needs and priorities. 
The current Director General is Enaam Barrishi.

See also
Art in Jordan
Jabal Amman

References

External links
 Jordan River Foundation website

1995 establishments in Jordan
Organizations established in 1995
Jordanian art
Jordanian culture
Non-profit organisations based in Jordan